Wang Dan is the name of:

 Wang Dan (Song dynasty) (957–1017), Song dynasty grand councilor
 Wang Dan (dissident) (born 1969), Chinese dissident and student leader in the 1989 Tiananmen Square Protest
 Wang Dan (speed skater) (born 1983), Chinese speed skater
 Wang Dan (triathlete) (born 1980), Chinese triathlete
 Wang Dan (swimmer) (born 1984), Chinese swimmer

See also
Wangdan, a township in Bainang County, Tibet, China
Daniel Wang (disambiguation)